The 1993 Kyrgyzstan League is the 2nd season of Kyrgyzstan League, the Football Federation of Kyrgyz Republic's top division of association football. Alga RIIF Bishkek won the league in which seventeen teams participated in.

League standings

Promotion/relegation play-off
Maksat Belovodskoye who finished in sixteenth place, played off against Northern Zone champions of Division two Dzhashtyk Ysyk Ata.
Uchkun Kara Suu  who finished in seventeenth place, played off against Southern Zone champions of Division two Aka Atyn Kara Suu.
There weren't any promotions to the top division or relegations to the lower division. 
Aka Atyn Kara Suu did partake in the 1994 season due to withdrawals prior to that season.

Match 1

Match 2

References

Kyrgyzstan - List of final tables (RSSSF)

Kyrgyzstan League seasons
1
Kyrgyzstan
Kyrgyzstan